Biana Kovic (also Biana Cvetkovic) is a professional cellist and educator, specialized in teaching adolescents and adults to play the cello. Kovic's film company is Fullmoon Productions. In 2006, Kovic created a documentary film about Matty Kahn who learned to play a cello at age 89. 
Kovic is a founder of It's Never 2 Late, Inc., based in NY.

Filmography 
 2007 Virtuoso - short documentary. Director, producer, editor, and as herself.

References

External links
 
Official website
 Biana Kovic at kaufmanmusiccenter.org

Women documentary filmmakers
Living people
Serbian cellists
Women cellists
Year of birth missing (living people)
Serbian documentary filmmakers